Ebro is a census-designated place and unincorporated community in Falk Township, Clearwater County, Minnesota, United States. Its population was 64 as of the 2010 census.

Demographics

History
A post office called Ebro was established in 1898, and remained in operation until it was discontinued in 1975. The community was named after the Ebro River, in Spain.

References

Census-designated places in Clearwater County, Minnesota
Census-designated places in Minnesota